Shinzan No.1 Dam is an earthfill dam located in Akita Prefecture in Japan. The dam is used for irrigation. The catchment area of the dam is 1 km2. The dam impounds about 1  ha of land when full and can store 70 thousand cubic meters of water. The construction of the dam was completed in 1922.

References

Dams in Akita Prefecture
1922 establishments in Japan